Alleman Catholic High School is a private, Roman Catholic high school in Rock Island, Illinois. It is located in the Roman Catholic Diocese of Peoria. It is the second largest Catholic high school in the Quad Cities.

School history
Alleman High School was established in 1949 and named for Rev John George Alleman. Its first principal was Father John F. O'Connor.

Activities
Student Council
Key Club
National Honor Society
Sigma Alpha Delta
Dance Marathon
Pioneer Press Newspaper
Reflections Literary Magazine
Yearbook
SPEC
ACES Academic Challenge
ICTM Math Competition
Game Club
Student Hunger Drive
Band (Concert/Pep)
Choir (Auditioned)
Student Ambassadors
Drama Club (featuring a fall musical, as well as plays in winter and spring)

Athletics
Alleman High School competes in the Illinois High School Association and is a member school of the Western Big 6 Conference.   Available for the male students are baseball, basketball, cross country, football, golf, soccer, tennis, track & field, and wrestling.  Female students have cheerleading, basketball, cross country, the Emeralds dance team, soccer, softball, tennis, track & field, golf, and volleyball available.  The school's mascot is the Pioneer.

Notable alumni
Lane Evans, Democratic member of the United States House of Representatives from 1983 until 2007.
Christopher Glancy, Catholic bishop in Belize
Mark Johnson, Olympian and winningest Wrestling Coach at the University of Illinois.
Adam Lingner, NFL Long Snapper (1983–95); played in four Super Bowls.
Gene Oliver, professional Baseball Player
Bobby Schilling, former U.S. Congressman from Illinois's 17th congressional district
Cody Sedlock, pitcher for the Baltimore Orioles

References

External links
 IHSA Profile

Roman Catholic Diocese of Peoria
Catholic secondary schools in Illinois
Buildings and structures in Rock Island, Illinois
Educational institutions established in 1949
Schools in Rock Island County, Illinois
1949 establishments in Illinois